The coat of arms of Moldova is the national emblem of the Republic of Moldova.

Official description
Moldovan law describes the arms as follows:

Per fess gules and azure, an aurochs head cabossed overall, accompanied by a mullet of eight points between the horns, a heraldic rose to dexter and a crescent decrescent to sinister, all or; supporter, behind the shield: an eagle (heraldic, wings inverted) proper (golden brown), beaked and membered gules, holding in his beak a cross or, in his dexter talon an olive branch vert and in his sinister a scepter or.

Historical coats of arms of Moldova

See also 

Flag of Moldova
Coat of arms of Romania
Flag of the Moldavian Soviet Socialist Republic
Emblem of the Moldavian Soviet Socialist Republic
Flag of Transnistria
Coat of arms of Transnistria

References

 Ministry of Defence

External links
 1992 Postage stamps with the coat of arms of Moldova

National symbols of Moldova
 
Moldova
Moldova
Moldova
Moldova
Moldova
Moldova
Moldova
Moldova
Moldova
Moldova